The Lew Hayman Trophy is a Canadian Football League trophy, awarded to the outstanding Canadian player in the East Division. Each team in the East Division nominates a player, from which the winner is chosen. Either the winner of the Hayman trophy or the Dr. Beattie Martin Trophy will also win the Canadian Football League Most Outstanding Canadian award.

As part of the failed American expansion in 1995, the Hayman trophy was awarded to the Martin Trophy runner-up, as the South Division teams (to which other East Division titles were assigned to that year) did not have an import quota.

The trophy is named after Lew Hayman, former coach and general manager of the Toronto Argonauts and the Montreal Alouettes, as well as a past CFL president.

Lew Hayman Trophy winners

 2022 – Kurleigh Gittens Jr. (WR), Toronto Argonauts
 2021 – David Ménard (DL), Montreal Alouettes
 2020 – season cancelled - covid 19
 2019 - Henoc Muamba (LB), Montreal Alouettes
 2018 - Brad Sinopoli (WR), Ottawa Redblacks
 2017 - Brad Sinopoli (WR), Ottawa Redblacks
 2016 - Andy Fantuz (SB), Hamilton Tiger-Cats
 2015 - Brad Sinopoli (WR), Ottawa Redblacks
 2014 - Ted Laurent (DT), Hamilton Tiger-Cats
 2013 - Henoc Muamba (LB), Winnipeg Blue Bombers
 2012 - Shea Emry (LB), Montreal Alouettes
 2011 - Sean Whyte (K), Montreal Alouettes
 2010 - Dave Stala (SB), Hamilton Tiger-Cats
 2009 - Ben Cahoon (SB), Montreal Alouettes
 2008 - Ben Cahoon (SB), Montreal Alouettes
 2007 - Doug Brown (DT), Winnipeg Blue Bombers
 2006 - Doug Brown (DT), Winnipeg Blue Bombers
 2005 - Kevin Eiben (LB), Toronto Argonauts
 2004 - Kevin Eiben (LB), Toronto Argonauts
 2003 - Ben Cahoon (SB), Montreal Alouettes
 2002 - Ben Cahoon (SB), Montreal Alouettes
 2001 - Doug Brown (DE), Winnipeg Blue Bombers
 2000 - Davis Sanchez (CB), Montreal Alouettes
 1999 - Mike O'Shea (LB), Toronto Argonauts
 1998 - Mike Morreale (SB), Hamilton Tiger-Cats
 1997 - Jock Climie (SB), Montreal Alouettes
 1996 - Michael Soles (FB), Montreal Alouettes
 1995 - Dave Sapunjis (SB), Calgary Stampeders
 1994 - Gerald Wilcox (SB), Winnipeg Blue Bombers
 1993 - Gerald Wilcox (SB), Winnipeg Blue Bombers
 1992 - Ken Evraire (SB), Hamilton Tiger-Cats
 1991 - Lance Chomyc (K), Toronto Argonauts
 1990 - Paul Osbaldiston (K), Hamilton Tiger-Cats
 1989 - Rocky DiPietro (SB), Hamilton Tiger-Cats
 1988 - Orville Lee (RB), Ottawa Rough Riders
 1987 - Scott Flagel (DS), Winnipeg Blue Bombers
 1986 - Rocky DiPietro (SB), Hamilton Tiger-Cats
 1985 - Paul Bennett (DB), Hamilton Tiger-Cats
 1984 - Nick Arakgi (SB), Montreal Concordes
 1983 - Denny Ferdinand (RB), Montreal Concordes
 1982 - Rocky DiPietro (SB), Hamilton Tiger-Cats
 1981 - Tony Gabriel (TE), Ottawa Rough Riders
 1980 - Gerry Dattilio (QB), Montreal Alouettes
 1979 - Leif Pettersen (SB), Hamilton Tiger-Cats
 1978 - Tony Gabriel (TE), Ottawa Rough Riders
 1977 - Tony Gabriel (TE), Ottawa Rough Riders
 1976 - Tony Gabriel (TE), Ottawa Rough Riders
 1975 - Jim Foley (WR), Ottawa Rough Riders

Outstanding Canadian player in the East Division prior to the trophy

 1974 - Tony Gabriel (TE), Hamilton Tiger-Cats
 1973 - Gerry Organ (K), Ottawa Rough Riders
 1972 - Gerry Organ (K), Ottawa Rough Riders
 1971 - Terry Evanshen (WR), Montreal Alouettes
 1970 - Al Phaneuf (DB), Montreal Alouettes
 1969 - Russ Jackson (QB), Ottawa Rough Riders
 1968 - Whit Tucker (WR), Ottawa Rough Riders
 1967 - Russ Jackson (QB), Ottawa Rough Riders
 1966 - Russ Jackson (QB), Ottawa Rough Riders
 1965 - Zeno Karcz (LB), Hamilton Tiger-Cats
 1964 - Tommy Grant (WR), Hamilton Tiger-Cats
 1963 - Russ Jackson (QB), Ottawa Rough Riders
 1962 - Russ Jackson (QB), Ottawa Rough Riders
 1961 - Bobby Kuntz (LB), Toronto Argonauts
 1960 - Ron Stewart (RB), Ottawa Rough Riders
 1959 - Russ Jackson (QB), Ottawa Rough Riders
 1958 - Ron Howell (FW), Hamilton Tiger-Cats
 1957 - Bobby Kuntz (LB), Toronto Argonauts
 1956 - Bob Simpson (FW), Ottawa Rough Riders
 1955 - Bob Simpson, Ottawa Rough Riders & Joey Pal, Montreal Alouettes

References
CFL Publications: 2011 Facts, Figures & Records

Canadian Football League trophies and awards